Hammouda Pacha Mosque or  Hamouda Pacha al Mouradi is a mosque in Tunis, Tunisia. It is an official historical monument.

Localization 
This mosque is located in the Medina area of the city, in the Sidi Ben Arous street.

History 
Built in 1655 by Hammouda Pacha,  it is the second mosque to be built by the Hanafi rite in Tunis.

Architecture 

The Hammouda Pacha mosque is known for its Turkish architecture. It has an octagon minaret and the hall of prayer is rectangular.

References

Mosques in the medina of Tunis
Religious buildings and structures completed in 1655
1655 establishments in the Ottoman Empire
1655 establishments in Africa
Ottoman architecture in Tunisia
17th-century mosques